Delchev Ridge (Delchev Hrebet \'del-chev 'hre-bet\) is the eastern ridge of the Tangra Mountains, Livingston Island extending 10 km east-northeastward from Devin Saddle to Renier Point.  The ridge is named in association with its summit Delchev Peak (ca. 940 m).

The north slopes of the ridge between Elena Peak and Renier Point together with the adjacent portion of Sopot Ice Piedmont are a popular site for backcountry skiing and climbing, with skiers landed by Zodiac rigid inflatable boats from cruise ships visiting the Half Moon Island area.

Location
The ridge was mapped by the UK Directorate of Overseas Surveys in 1968, Argentine mapping in 1980 and Bulgarian mapping in 2005 and 2009.

Delchev Ridge in popular culture
The cover of the VA album Under Heaven: Vinson Massif (2010) actually features a photo not of Vinson Massif but of Delchev Ridge instead, with Mugla Passage and Vaptsarov Peak in the foreground, and (left to right) Elena Peak and Delchev Peak in the background.  Both the picture and the misidentification may have possibly originated in the ‘Vinson Massif’ entry of the ‘Seven Summits Quest’ website.

See also
Tangra Mountains
Livingston Island
South Shetland Islands
Antarctica

Maps
 South Shetland Islands. Scale 1:200000 topographic map No. 3373. DOS 610 – W 62 58. Tolworth, UK, 1968.
 Islas Livingston y Decepción.  Mapa topográfico a escala 1:100000.  Madrid: Servicio Geográfico del Ejército, 1991.
 S. Soccol, D. Gildea and J. Bath. Livingston Island, Antarctica. Scale 1:100000 satellite map. The Omega Foundation, USA, 2004.
 L.L. Ivanov et al., Antarctica: Livingston Island and Greenwich Island, South Shetland Islands (from English Strait to Morton Strait, with illustrations and ice-cover distribution), 1:100000 scale topographic map, Antarctic Place-names Commission of Bulgaria, Sofia, 2005
 L.L. Ivanov. Antarctica: Livingston Island and Greenwich, Robert, Snow and Smith Islands. Scale 1:120000 topographic map. Troyan: Manfred Wörner Foundation, 2010.  (First edition 2009. )
 Antarctic Digital Database (ADD). Scale 1:250000 topographic map of Antarctica. Scientific Committee on Antarctic Research (SCAR), 1993–2016.

Notes

References
 Delchev Ridge. SCAR Composite Gazetteer of Antarctica.
 Bulgarian Antarctic Gazetteer. Antarctic Place-names Commission. (details in Bulgarian, basic data in English)

External links
 Delchev Ridge. Copernix satellite image

Tangra Mountains
Ridges of Antarctica